Lowitja Lois O'Donoghue Smart,   (born 1932) is an Aboriginal Australian retired public administrator. In 1990-1996 she was the inaugural chairperson of the Aboriginal and Torres Strait Islander Commission (ATSIC) (dismantled in 2004). She is patron of the Lowitja Institute, a research institute for Aboriginal & Torres Strait Islander health and wellbeing.

Early life and education
Lois O'Donoghue was born in 1932 the remote Aboriginal community of Indulkana, the fifth of six children of the common-law marriage of Tom and Lily O'Donoghue. Her father was a stockman of Irish descent and her mother was a member of the Pitjantjatjara Aboriginal clan of northwest South Australia. After living at Everard Park, where they had two children, the O'Donoghues moved in 1925 to Granite Downs, a large cattle property bordering the east of the Stuart Highway in the north of South Australia.

Their four youngest children were born here, including Lois on 1 August 1932, who was baptised by a pastor from the United Aborigines Mission. When she was just two years old, she and two of her sisters were taken away from their mother by missionaries on behalf of South Australia's Aboriginal Protection Board to Oodnadatta run by the Baptists. From here they were moved to the recently opened Colebrook Home in Quorn run by the Mission.

According to O'Donoghue she was very happy living at Colebrook and said she received a sound education both there and at the Quorn Primary School. The Quorn community at large actively encouraged children from the home to participate in local events, and assisted in the maintenance of the home. Only a few people objected to the integration. In 1944 Colebrook Home moved to Eden Hills, South Australia, due to chronic water shortages, enabling her to attend Unley High School, a local public school, and obtain her Intermediate Certificate. She was taught up until the Leaving Certificate standard but did not sit for the examination.

At Colebrook Home the elder children assisted in taking care of younger children. Thus, with this experience, at the age of 16, Lois O'Donoghue's first job was as a nanny looking after six children with a family in Victor Harbor some 85 km south of Adelaide. While attending the Baptist church there she was persuaded by the Matron of the South Coast District Hospital to take up nursing as a career.

After the publication of the Bringing Them Home report in 1997, she said she preferred the word "removed" to the word "stolen" (as used in Stolen Generations) for her personal situation. She was the youngest child in her family, and was two years old when she was removed from her mother. After she was removed, she did not see her mother again for 33 years. During that time, her mother did not know where her family had been taken.

Career

Nursing
From 1950 to 1953 O'Donoghue worked as a nursing aide in Victor Harbor. The small hospital did not run a comprehensive training course, so with the strong support and assistance of the matron, she applied to be a student nurse in Adelaide. After a long struggle to win admission to a training hospital, she became the first black nurse in South Australia. The Royal Adelaide Hospital (RAH) policy at that time was to only take nursing students who had obtained their leaving certificate, so initially they would not consider taking her. Shortly afterwards the hospital introduced a plan to allow deserving students to be accepted without the necessary educational qualifications. In 1954, she was in the first intake of unqualified students to attend the RAH, which offered good nursing career prospects. She qualified as a nurse and worked at the RAH until 1961, being appointed a charge nurse just before leaving.

She spent time with the Baptist Church working in Assam, northern India as a nurse relieving missionaries who were taking leave back in Australia. Due to the nearby Sino-Indian War she was advised by the Australian government to evacuate to Calcutta, from where she would depart for her return to Australia.

Public service
After returning in 1962, she worked as an Aboriginal liaison officer with the South Australian Government's Department of Education.

In 1967 O'Donoghue joined the Commonwealth Public Service as a junior administrative officer in an Adelaide office. After eight years she became the Director of the Department of Aboriginal Affairs's office in South Australia, a senior officer position, responsible for the local implementation of national Aboriginal welfare policy. After a short while she left the public service and had various management/administrative roles with non-government organisations. She was appointed by the Government as chairperson of the Aboriginal Development Commission.

Other roles

O'Donoghue was a chairperson of the National Aboriginal Conference for a short time in the early 1980s before it was dissolved due to internal disputes on its direction.

In 1990 O'Donoghue was appointed Chairperson of the Aboriginal and Torres Strait Islander Commission, a position she held until 1996. In 1991, with Alf Bamblett and Steve Gordon, she became one of the first Aboriginal people to attend a cabinet meeting.  O'Donoghue used this occasion to put forward ATSIC's position with regard to the government's response to the Royal Commission into Aboriginal Deaths in Custody.

In December 1992, O'Donoghue became the first Aboriginal Australian to address the United Nations General Assembly during the launch of the United Nations International Year of Indigenous People. She was replaced as chairperson by Gatjil Djerrkura, who was considered by the Howard Government to be more moderate.

Recognition and honours
In the 1976 Australia Day Honours, O'Donoghue became the first Aboriginal woman to be inducted into the new Order of Australia founded by the Labor Australian Commonwealth Government. The appoint, as a Member of the Order (AM) was in recognition of her work in the welfare field, and "for service to the Aboriginal community in South Australia."

O'Donoghue was appointed a Commander of the Order of the British Empire (CBE) in the 1983 New Year Honours for service to the Aboriginal community, and was named Australian of the Year in 1984, for her work to improve the welfare of Australian Aboriginal and Torres Strait Islander people.

She was appointed a Companion of the Order of Australia (AC) in the 1999 Australia Day Honours, "for public service through leadership to Indigenous and non-indigenous Australiansin the areas of human rights and social justice, particularly as chairperson of the Aboriginal and Torres Strait Islander Commission."

O'Donoghue has received honorary doctorates from Murdoch University, University of South Australia, Australian National University, Queensland University of Technology and Flinders University. In 2000 she was awarded an honorary professorial fellow at Flinders University and was a visiting fellow at Flinders University.

She is a National Patron at the Bob Hawke Prime Ministerial Centre and was inducted into the Olympic Order in 2000.

In 2005 O'Donoghue was invested as a Dame of the Order of St Gregory the Great (DSG) by Pope John Paul II.

In May 2017 O'Donoghue was one of three Indigenous Australians, along with Tom Calma and Galarrwuy Yunupingu,  honoured by Australia Post in the 2017 Legends Commemorative Stamp "Indigenous leaders" series to mark the 50th anniversary of the 1967 referendum.

In September 2021, O'Donoghue was awarded an honorary doctorate from the University of Adelaide for her "lifetime contribution to the advancement of Aboriginal and Torres Strait Islander rights, leading to significant outcomes in health, education, political representation, land rights and reconciliation.”

Lowitja O'Donoghue Oration

Since her inaugural oration at the Don Dunstan Foundation in 2007, the annual Lowitja O'Donoghue Oration has been held annually by the Foundation, with a series of speakers illuminating aspects of Indigenous Australians' past and future in Australian society. It is held each year in Reconciliation Week, with the 2007 event celebrating the 40th anniversary of the  1967 referendum. Each orator is chosen by O'Donoghue.

Speakers have included:
2007: Lowitja O'Donoghue
2008: Tim Costello
2009: Jackie Huggins and Fred Chaney
2010: Ray Martin
2011: Paul Keating
2012: Michael Kirby
2013: Olga Havnen
2014: Pat Dodson
2015: Marcia Langton
2016: Lynn Arnold
2017: Frank Brennan
2018: Noel Pearson
2019: David Rathman
2020: No event due to the COVID-19 pandemic in Australia
2021: Pat Anderson
2022: Linda Burney

Lowitja Institute
The Lowitja Institute is a national research centre focusing on Aboriginal and Torres Strait Islander health, established in January 2010 and named in honour of its patron.

The Lowitja Institute Aboriginal and Torres Strait Islander Health CRC  (also known as the Lowitja Institute CRC), funded by the Australian Government's Cooperative Research Centres (CRC) programme, was part of the Institute until 30 June 2019. The history of this and the whole Lowitja Institute dates from the first CRC, the CRC for Aboriginal and Tropical Health (CRCATH), which was founded in Darwin in 1997 with Lowitja as chair. Based on its success, two further CRCs were funded by the government: CRC for Aboriginal Health (CRCAH, 2003–2009), followed by the CRC for Aboriginal and Torres Strait Islander Health (CRCATSIH, 2010–2014), this time hosted by the new Lowitja Institute. The Lowitja Institute CRC developed three research programmes and conducted workshops.

Both the Institute and the CRCs have led reform in Indigenous health research, with Aboriginal and Torres Strait Islander people determining the outcomes.

, there are 12 member organisations of the Lowitja Institute, including AIATSIS, the Australian Indigenous Doctors’ Association (AIDA),  Flinders University, the Menzies School of Health Research, the Healing Foundation and the University of Melbourne. Directors of the Institute include June Oscar, Pat Anderson, and Peter Buckskin.

The Institute provides project grants for up to three years to Aboriginal and Torres Strait Islander organisations or groups undertaking research focused on improving Indigenous health and wellbeing. The main requirement is that the research aligns with the themes of the Lowitja Institute Research Agenda of empowerment, sovereignty, connectedness, and cultural safety in the healthcare setting.

Marriage and personal life
In 1979 she married Gordon Smart, a medical orderly at the Repatriation Hospital whom she had first met in 1964. He died in 1992. He had six adult children from a previous marriage.

Following her retirement, she formally added the name Lowitja (an Aboriginal phonetic adaptation of her given name Lois) to her existing legal name, Lois O'Donoghue Smart, to emphasize her Yankunytjatjara Aboriginal heritage.

References

Further reading

 
 
 Hawke Centre, University of South Australia > Patrons > Professor Lowitja O'Donoghue AC CBE

External links
 

1932 births
Living people
Indigenous Australians in South Australia
Australian Commanders of the Order of the British Empire
Australian indigenous rights activists
Women human rights activists
Australian of the Year Award winners
Australian people of Irish descent
Australian women nurses
Australian nurses
Companions of the Order of Australia
Dames Commander of St. Gregory the Great
Members of the Stolen Generations
Recipients of the Olympic Order
Australian republicans